Andrey Balabanov (born 17 August 1966 in Kherson, Ukrainian SSR) is a Soviet-born Ukrainian sprint canoer who competed in the early 1990s. He won three bronze medals at the ICF Canoe Sprint World Championships with two in the C-2 10000 m (1990, 1993) and one in the C-4 1000 m (1993) events.

References

Living people
Soviet male canoeists
Ukrainian male canoeists
1966 births
ICF Canoe Sprint World Championships medalists in Canadian
National University of Ukraine on Physical Education and Sport alumni
Sportspeople from Kherson